Isaac Lawson (died 1747), was a Scottish physician. He became a student of Leyden University on 17 May 1730. There he studied medicine and botany under Herman Boerhaave and Adriaan van Royen, and became the intimate friend of Linnaeus, whom he several times assisted with gifts of money. In conjunction with Jan Frederik Gronovius he was at the expense of the printing of the Systema Naturæ of Linnaeus in 1735. Lawson obtained his doctorate in medicine on December 28, 1737 in Leiden with a thesis on zinc oxide, his thesis being entitled Dissertatio Academica sistens Nihil.

From spring to autumn 1738 he undertook an extensive trip to the most famous German mines, during which he made extensive minerals for his private mineral collection. Via Hanover he first arrived in Goslar. From there he went on excursions to Zellerfeld and Clausthal. Three weeks later he traveled on to Sankt Andreasberg. He sent samples of his collected minerals to Hieronymus David Gaubius, Johann Andreas Cramer and  Gronovius. His further path led him via Berlin and Halle to Leipzig, where he met Johann Ernst Hebenstreit and Christian Gottlieb Ludwig. In Freiberg he met Johann Friedrich Henckel every day. When he arrived in Karlsbad, he realized that his plans to travel to Prague, Vienna and Hungary were no longer realistic, and he returned to England via Flanders and Holland.

He afterwards became a physician to the British army and took part in the Austrian Wars of Succession. His death is possibly due to wounds inflicted at the Battle of Lauffeldt on 2 July 1747. He died at Oosterhout in the Netherlands in the same year.

Legacy
Linnaeus dedicated to him the genus Lawsonia, the henna of the East. Lawson is mentioned in Dr. Maton's edition of Linnaeus's Diary, and included in his reprint of Richard Pulteney's View of the Writings of Linnaeus.

Another Isaac Lawson, possibly a son, entered Leyden University 13 March 1747, and is described in the register as Britanno-Edinburgensis.

References

Attribution

1747 deaths
18th-century Scottish medical doctors
British Army personnel of the War of the Austrian Succession
Scottish mineralogists
Leiden University alumni